Princess Elisabeth of Prussia (18 June 1815 – 21 March 1885) was the second daughter of Prince Wilhelm of Prussia and Princess Maria Anna of Hesse-Homburg and a granddaughter of Frederick William II of Prussia. Through her eldest son Louis IV, Prince Philip, Duke of Edinburgh was her great-great-grandson, and she is consequently an ancestor of Charles III.

Biography
Elisabeth was born in Berlin to Prince Wilhelm of Prussia and Princess Maria Anna of Hesse-Homburg.  Through her father, she was a granddaughter of Frederick William II of Prussia. Through her mother, she was a granddaughter of Frederick V, Landgrave of Hesse-Homburg.  She was the fifth of seven surviving children. One of her sisters, Marie, became Queen of Bavaria.

Elisabeth had good relationship with her daughter-in-law, Alice. In her later years, Elisabeth gained more weight and became obese. She lived to see her son ascend the throne as Grand Duke of Hesse and by Rhine on 13 June 1877 and to see Louis and Alice's two eldest daughters marry. Elisabeth and Charles' first great-grandchild, Princess Alice of Battenberg, was also born during her lifetime. She died in Bessungen at the age of 69, outliving her husband by eight years.

Issue
Elisabeth married Prince Charles of Hesse and by Rhine, second son of Louis II, Grand Duke of Hesse, on 22 October 1836 in Berlin. She had four children:
Louis IV, Grand Duke of Hesse and by Rhine (12 September 1837 – 13 March 1892); reigned from 13 June 1877 until his death; married, firstly, Princess Alice of the United Kingdom and had issue. Married, secondly, Alexandrina Hutten-Czapska; annulled.
Prince Henry of Hesse and by Rhine (28 November 1838 – 16 September 1900); married, firstly, Baroness Karoline of Nidda; had one son. Married, secondly, Baroness Emily of Dornberg; had one son.
Princess Anna of Hesse and by Rhine (25 May 1843 – 16 April 1865); married Frederick Francis II, Grand Duke of Mecklenburg-Schwerin and had one daughter, Duchess Anna.
Prince William of Hesse and by Rhine (16 November 1845 – 24 May 1900); married Baroness Josephine von Lichtenberg.

Ancestry

References

1815 births
1885 deaths
House of Hohenzollern
House of Hesse-Darmstadt
Burials at the Mausoleum for the Grand Ducal House of Hesse, Rosenhöhe (Darmstadt)